Aleksander Wojtkiewicz (January 15, 1963 – July 14, 2006) was a Polish chess grandmaster. He was born in Latvia. In his early teens he was already a strong player; a student of ex-world champion Mikhail Tal whom he assisted in the 1979 Interzonal tournament in Riga. He won the Latvian Chess Championship in 1981. His promising chess career was interrupted when he refused to join the Soviet Army. For several years he went undercover but in 1986 he was sentenced to two years in prison. After one year he received an amnesty after the meeting of Presidents Ronald Reagan and Mikhail Gorbachev. Following his release he moved from Riga to Warsaw where he won two Polish Chess Championships. He played for Poland in the Chess Olympiads of 1990 and 1992.

He later resided in the United States, whereupon he became one of the most active players on the tournament circuit, constantly flying around the world. Several times he won the annual $10,000 first prize for Grand Prix chess tournaments in the United States.

Wojtkiewicz played in the FIDE World Chess Championship 2004. In his final months, he tied for first at the 2006 World Open in Philadelphia and won the 2006 National Open in Las Vegas. 
He died on the evening of 14 July 2006 from a perforated intestine and massive bleeding.

Wojtkiewicz's strategies have been investigated in the online series "How Wojo Won" by chess master Jonathan Hilton. The six-part series began in December 2006 and continued until April 2008. Hilton has also co-authored a book, Wojo's Weapons: Winning with White, Volume I, focusing on Wojtkiewicz's opening play.

Notable games
Aleksander Wojtkiewicz vs Robert Kuczynski, Biel 1990, Slav Defense: Modern Line (D11), 1-0
Aleksander Wojtkiewicz vs Spyridon Skembris, Novi Sad 50/521 1990, English Opening: Agincourt Defense, Catalan Defense (A13), 1-0
Aleksander Wojtkiewicz vs David Filipovich, 29th World Open 2001, Queen Pawn Game: Symmetrical Variation (D02), 1-0
Jennifer Shahade vs Aleksander Wojtkiewicz, 114th New York Masters 2004, Sicilian Defense: Hyperaccelerated Dragon (B35), 0-1

References

External links 
 US Tournament Record for Aleksander Wojtkiewicz
 
 Obituary by GM Alexander Shabalov
 His Elonumbers from 1990 to present

1963 births
2006 deaths
Latvian chess players
Polish chess players
American chess players
Chess grandmasters
Sportspeople from Riga
20th-century chess players